PSCI may refer to:

 Park Street Collegiate Institute, a former high school in Orillia, Ontario, Canada 
 Penn State Cancer Institute, US
 PowerShares S&P SmallCap Industrials Portfolio (NASDAQ: PSCI), in Invesco PowerShares
 PSCI, owner of PSC-Naval Dockyard, Malaysia
 The Power State Coordination Interface, used for power management in the ARM architecture

See also
 Pisces I (Psc I) a galaxy
 Iota Piscium (ι Psc) a star